is a Japanese track and field athlete. He competed in the men's long jump at the 2000 Summer Olympics.

His wife Ryoko (née Jojima) was the 1992 Asian junior champion in the 100 metres hurdles. His nephew Yuki Hashioka is the former Japanese record holder in the long jump.

He is currently the director and advisor of the track and field club at Hachioji High School. He coached his nephew Yuki Hashioka from 2014 to 2017.

International competition

National titles
National Championships
Long jump: 2001
National Sports Festival
Long jump: 1992, 1993

References

External links

Daisuke Watanabe at JOC 
Daisuke Watanabe at Mizuno  (archived)

1975 births
Living people
Athletes from Tokyo
Japanese athletics coaches
Japanese male long jumpers
Olympic male long jumpers
Olympic athletes of Japan
Athletes (track and field) at the 2000 Summer Olympics
World Athletics Championships athletes for Japan
Japan Championships in Athletics winners
Nihon University alumni